Castillo de Belmez is a small fortress located in Bélmez, northwest of Córdoba, in the Province of Córdoba, Spain.  It is visible from any angle, as it sits on top of a high limestone rocky outcrop. The neighboring municipalities of Peñarroya-Pueblonuevo, Espiel and Fuente Obejuna are viewable from the castle.

References

Castles in Andalusia
13th-century fortifications